The 2003 Rutgers Scarlet Knights football team represented Rutgers University in the 2003 NCAA Division I FBS football season. The Scarlet Knights were led by third-year head coach Greg Schiano and played their home games at Rutgers Stadium. They are a member of the Big East Conference. They finished the season 5–7, 2–5 in Big East play to finish in a tie with Syracuse for 6th place.

Schedule

References

Rutgers
Rutgers Scarlet Knights football seasons
Rutgers Scarlet Knights football